Henry Chung or Zhong Wuxiong (September 9, 1918 – April 23, 2017) was a Chinese diplomat who served in the Nationalist government of China. He was later the owner of a restaurant known for its Hunan cuisine.  Chung was on good terms with Ho Feng-Shan as  the two men's wives were sisters.

Early life and education
Chung was born in 1918 Liling, Hunan. Later, he entered Changjun High School. After graduation, Chung was recruited by the National Revolutionary Army as a cashier. He enrolled at then National Central University in Chongqing, in 1938.  He studied English for two years before transferring to the history department.

Career
After being a qualified civil servant, Chung traveled to Japan as a member of a military delegation in the end of 1945. Then he was appointed as a vice consul in Houston, three years later, brought together his family. However, overdue salaries made him decide to quit and start his own business. The Nationalist government summoned Chung to Taiwan after it was defeated in the Chinese Civil War, but Chung stayed in America.

Chung and his family moved to San Francisco eventually. There, they opened their restaurants providing Hunan cuisine, he also published his own recipes. He worked at the local branch of China Airlines meantime.

Later life and death
In 1981, Chung and his wife put up money for a new marker built on China Beach. Thereafter, he donated several schools to his hometown in Hunan province. He also supported Yuan Longping.

Adhered to the inland village custom, Chung married a 12-year-old when he was only 8, he had his first child at age 16. He met and married another student from Hunan named Diana or Huang Derong.

Chung died on April 23, 2017, in San Francisco, aged 99.

References 

1918 births
2017 deaths
Chinese emigrants to the United States
Writers from Hunan
American restaurateurs